State Route 373 (SR 373) is a  east-west state highway in southern Middle Tennessee. It connects the community of Culleoka with the cities of Lewisburg and Columbia, along with I-65.

Route description

SR 373 begins in Maury County at an intersection with SR 50 a few miles southeast of Columbia. It heads south as Culleoka Highway through farmland as a two-lane highway to pass through Culleoka, where it makes a sharp turn to the east. The highway winds its way east through more hilly terrain for a few miles to cross into Marshall County. SR 373 winds its way through rural hilly countryside for several more miles as Mooresville Highway, where it has an interchange with I-65 (Exit 32) and widens to a four-lane undivided highway, before entering Lewisburg at an intersection with SR 417 (W Ellington Parkway). The highway becomes W Commerce Street and passes through neighborhoods for several miles before entering downtown. SR 373 then comes to an end at the courthouse square at an intersection with US 31A Business/US 431 Business/SR 11/SR 50 (2nd Avenue/E Commerce Street).

History

The entire route of SR 373 was originally designated as State Route 50A (SR 50A). It has since been renumbered, as many of Tennessee's alternate routes were, to SR 373.

Major intersections

References

373
Transportation in Maury County, Tennessee
Transportation in Marshall County, Tennessee